Richard P. "Rich" Myers (December 27, 1947 – December 1, 2010) was a Republican member of the Illinois House of Representatives, having represented the 94th district from 1995 until his death in 2010.

Representative Myers was a conservative Republican, who valued the importance of fiscal responsibility. Much of his time was spent doing constituent work when the Illinois House was not in session.

During the 2008 Republican Party presidential primaries, Myers worked on behalf of the presidential campaign of former U.S. Senator Fred Thompson serving as a congressional district chair for Illinois's 17th congressional district.

Representative Myers had expected to survive in acceptable health long enough to serve another term despite his struggle with ill health, but he died December 1, 2010, after a long battle with prostate cancer. He was lauded on his death for his contributions to the district, to its schools, and to Western Illinois University. He was succeeded by longtime aide Norine Hammond to fill the remainder of his term until the next election.

References

External links
Illinois General Assembly - Representative Richard P. Myers (R) 94th District official IL House website
Bills Committees
Project Vote Smart - Representative Richard P. 'Rich' Myers (IL) profile
Follow the Money - Richard P (Rich) Myers
2006 2004 2002 2000 1998 1996 campaign contributions
Death Announcement- Richard Myers

Republican Party members of the Illinois House of Representatives
1947 births
2010 deaths
Deaths from cancer in Illinois
Deaths from prostate cancer
21st-century American politicians